Deepwater Horizon is a 2016 American biographical disaster film based on the Deepwater Horizon explosion and oil spill in the Gulf of Mexico. Peter Berg directed it from a screenplay by Matthew Michael Carnahan and Matthew Sand. It stars Mark Wahlberg, Kurt Russell, John Malkovich, Gina Rodriguez, Dylan O'Brien, and Kate Hudson. It is adapted from "Deepwater Horizon's Final Hours", a December 25, 2010 article in The New York Times written by David Barstow, David Rohde, and Stephanie Saul.

Principal photography began on April 27, 2015, in New Orleans, Louisiana. The film premiered at the 2016 Toronto International Film Festival and was theatrically released in the United States on September 30, 2016. It received generally positive reviews, but was considered to be one of the biggest box-office bombs of all-time, grossing slightly less than $122 million worldwide against a budget of $156 million, resulting in a loss of $60–112 million for the studio. The film was nominated for two Oscars at the 89th Academy Awards: Best Sound Editing and Best Visual Effects, and a BAFTA Award for Best Sound at the 70th British Academy Film Awards.

Plot

On April 20, 2010, Deepwater Horizon, an oil drilling rig operated by private contractor Transocean, is set to complete drilling off the southern coast of Louisiana on behalf of BP. Chief Electronics Technician Michael "Mike" Williams and Offshore Installation Manager James "Mr. Jimmy" Harrell are surprised to learn that the workers assigned to test the integrity of recently completed cement work are being sent home early, without conducting a cement bond log (CBL), at the insistence of BP managers Donald Vidrine and Robert Kaluza. While Mike prepares the drilling team, including Caleb Holloway, Shane Roshto and Adam Weise. Harrell meets with Vidrine and persuades him to conduct a negative pressure test, which indicates the cement has not properly sealed the well from the high-pressure reservoir. Vidrine disputes the test finding and orders a second test. After concluding the second test was a success, Vidrine pressures senior toolpusher Jason Anderson to run more tests and orders the rig to remove the drilling mud and prepare the rig to move to its next job. 

At first, the operation goes smoothly, but the cement job eventually fails completely, triggering a massive blowout that overpowers and kills Weise, Roshto and majority of the other drill team members. Holloway and Vidrine manage to evacuate the floor in time.

A chain of equipment malfunctions, coupled with a failed attempt to seal the well, ignites the oil, killing Anderson and the other toolpushers. Andrea Fleytas, the rig's Dynamic Position Operator, tries to alert the Coast Guard, only to be overruled by her superior, Captain Curt Kuchta, on the grounds that the rig is not in any imminent danger, at least until the rig erupts in flames, then Kuchta sends out his own call for help. With oil now spewing into the ocean, an oil-covered pelican flies into the bridge of a nearby vessel, the Damon Bankston, which was there to collect the drilling mud from the well, and dies; the vessel heads towards the rig just as the workers begin a frantic evacuation, sending out a rescue team after seeing the rig burst into flames. Harrell, still alive, although seriously injured in the explosion, is rescued by Mike and assumes control of the situation, only to discover that the rig cannot be saved. Aaron Dale Burkeen, a close friend of Mike's, sacrifices himself to keep a burning crane from collapsing onto the surviving crew, while Mike and Caleb are able to rescue Vidrine and Kaluza and get them to safety.

As night falls and the burning oil lights up the area, the Coast Guard becomes aware of the incident and sends ships and aircraft to rescue the survivors, who are being ferried in the lifeboats to the Damon Bankston as it was already on scene to assist with the evacuation and rescue. With all the lifeboats full, Mike locates the emergency life raft, but it becomes separated from the rig before he and Andrea can board, causing the latter to suffer a panic attack. Just as the oil in the well itself ignites and destroys the rig, the two jump into the water and are picked up by rescuers, who then ferry them to the Damon Bankston, where the surviving crew mourn their lost crewmen and say the Lord's Prayer.

Returned home, the workers reunite with their families in a hotel lobby; during which the parents of one of the missing crew members accost Mike, resulting in him having a panic attack. Luckily, Mike's family rush in to comfort him.

The film ends with a series of clips showing the aftermath of the disaster, including testimony from the real-life Mike Williams and the revelation that Donald Vidrine and Robert Kaluza were the only two people prosecuted for their actions; both were charged with eleven counts of manslaughter. By 2015 these charges were dismissed.  Pictures appear of the eleven men who lost their lives before the credits.  The movie postscript reads: "The blowout lasted for 87 days, spilling an estimated 210 million gallons of oil into the Gulf of Mexico. It was the worst oil disaster in U.S. history."

Cast 

 Mark Wahlberg as Mike Williams
 Gina Rodriguez as Andrea Fleytas
 Kurt Russell as Jimmy "Mr. Jimmy" Harrell 
 John Malkovich as Donald Vidrine
 Ethan Suplee as Jason Anderson
 Kate Hudson as Felicia Williams
 Dylan O'Brien as Caleb Holloway
 Jason Kirkpatrick as Dale Burkeen
 Henry Frost as Shane Roshto 
 Brad Leland as Robert Kaluza
 Johnathan Angel as Gordon Jones
 J. D. Evermore as Dewey Revette  
 Jeremy Sande as Adam Weise
 Jason Pine as Stephen Curtis 
 Trace Adkins as grieving father in hotel
 Joe Chrest as David Sims
 James DuMont as Patrick O'Bryan
 Dave Maldonado as Captain Curt Kuchta
 Douglas M. Griffin as Alwin Landry
 Juston Street as Anthony Gervasio

Production

Development and writing
On March 8, 2011, it was announced that Summit Entertainment, Participant Media, and Image Nation had acquired the film rights to The New York Times article "Deepwater Horizon's Final Hours", written by David Barstow, David S. Rohde, and Stephanie Saul, and published on December 25, 2010, about the 2010 Deepwater Horizon explosion and subsequent oil spill. Matthew Sand was set to write the screenplay, while Lorenzo di Bonaventura was in talks to produce the film under his Di Bonaventura Pictures banner. Summit and Participant Media/Imagination would also finance the film. On acquiring the article to develop into a film, the president of Participant Media, Ricky Strauss said,
This is a perfect fit for us–a suspenseful and inspiring real-life account of everyday people whose values are tested in the face of an impending environmental disaster.

On July 24, 2012, Ric Roman Waugh was in talks with the studios to direct the film, Mark Vahradian was set to produce the film along with Bonaventura, and Lions Gate Entertainment also joined the project to produce and distribute. On July 11, 2014, it was announced that All Is Lost's director J. C. Chandor had been hired to direct the film; the screenplay's first draft was written by Sand, while Matthew Michael Carnahan wrote the second draft. In early October, it was confirmed that Summit would distribute the film, not Lionsgate. On January 30, 2015, it was reported that Lone Survivor director Peter Berg had replaced Chandor, and would re-team with Wahlberg on the film. Chandor exited due to creative differences.

Casting 
On August 19, 2014, casting began, with actor Mark Wahlberg added in the lead role of the film. Wahlberg plays Mike Williams, a real-life electronics technician on the Deepwater Horizon oil rig. On March 18, 2015, Gina Rodriguez was set to play a woman named Andrea Fleytas, who was on the bridge on board the Deepwater Horizon at the time of the blowout, and frantically tried to contact the Coast Guard. On April 10, 2015, Deadline reported that Dylan O'Brien was in talks to play Caleb Holloway. Kurt Russell joined the film on the same day O'Brien was in talks. Soon after, John Malkovich was confirmed cast, as a BP representative who fatally underestimates the dangers of working on the rig. Kate Hudson was announced as a cast member in May 2015, and playing the wife of Wahlberg's character; her role will be her first on-screen pairing with Russell, her stepfather, although they shared no dialogue in the film, only a hug.

Filming 
Principal photography on the film began on April 27, 2015. It was officially announced by Lionsgate on May 18, 2015, that filming had begun in New Orleans, Louisiana. Production designer Chris Seagers built a 70 ft (21m) tall, 85% scale version of the Deepwater Horizon rig in the parking lot of the abandoned Six Flags New Orleans park. The set included a functional helipad and elevators. Beneath it was a tank filled with two million gallons of water, simulating the Gulf of Mexico.

The film cost a total of $156 million to produce, with $122 million spent in Louisiana. As a result, Lionsgate (the studio financing the film) received a $37.7 million subsidy from the state, under Louisiana's film incentive program. Later estimates put the production cost at $110 million.

Release 
Deepwater Horizon had its world premiere at the Toronto International Film Festival, on September 13, where it received a standing ovation from audiences after the screening. It opened in theaters on September 30, 2016, distributed by Summit Entertainment in the United States and Canada, and by Lionsgate Entertainment internationally.

Reception

Box office
Deepwater Horizon grossed $61.4 million in the United States and Canada and $60.4 million in other territories for a worldwide total of $121.8 million, against a net production budget of around $110 million. The Hollywood Reporter judged it one of 2016's fourteen biggest box-office bombs.

In the United States and Canada, Deepwater Horizon was projected to gross $16–20 million from 3,259 theaters in its opening weekend, although some publications noted Wahlberg's films tend to outperform box office projections. The film made $860,000 from its Thursday night previews at 2,400 theaters, and $7.1 million on its first day. In total, the film earned $20.2 million during its opening weekend, debuting at number two at the box office behind Tim Burton's Miss Peregrine's Home for Peculiar Children. The film was released at a time when the marketplace was already dominated by two other adult-skewing pictures, The Magnificent Seven and Sully. The film over-performed in the Gulf Coast region, and also did exceptionally well in IMAX, which earned $2.7 million of the film's total opening weekend.

The film's opening weekend was regarded as underwhelming and a disappointment, given its hefty production budget, but dramas released during the fall, and Wahlberg's films, tend to have box office legs. Forbes called the opening "good, but not great", especially considering the solid reviews. While most adult-skewing films would generally be made on a conservative budget in order to protect themselves financially, Deepwater Horizon was produced for $110–120 million (after tax rebates). Box office analyst Jeff Block said the film was "a hard sell. This should have been a $60 million film. The budget was out of control." Recent real-life drama films such as Sully ($60 million budget), Bridge of Spies ($40 million) and Captain Phillips ($55 million) were made for more moderate amounts. The Hollywood Reporter noted that when Hollywood spends north of $100 million on a film, it is intended for a much broader audience, but that was not the case for Deepwater Horizon, as the main demographics were adults, with 67% of the total ticket buyers during its opening weekend being over the age of 35. Another possible reason for the film's mediocre debut was its marketing miss, which was also a subject of criticism; from the outset, Lionsgate marketed the film as a heroic tale versus an issues-oriented movie. The name "Deepwater Horizon" itself is more associated with the aftermath of the spill than the heroics of the men who survived and helped their fellow workers. The Hollywood Reporter estimated the film lost at least $60 million, when factoring together all expenses and revenues.

Outside North America, Deepwater Horizon opened simultaneously in 52 markets, and grossed $12.4 million, of which IMAX made up $1 million 119 IMAX screens. The U.K. was the top earning market, with $2.6 million, followed by the Middle East ($1.5 million), Taiwan ($1.4 million), Australia ($1.3 million), and Russia ($1.2 million). In China, the film opened on Tuesday, November 15, where it delivered a six-day opening weekend of $7.9 million, debuting in third place, behind local film I Am Not Madame Bovary and the continuation of Doctor Strange. The next major markets to open were Germany (November 24) and Spain (November 25).

Critical response
Deepwater Horizon received generally positive reviews from critics. On Rotten Tomatoes the film has an approval rating of 83% based on 260 reviews with an average rating of 7.00/10. The site's critical consensus reads, "Deepwater Horizon makes effective use of its titular man-made disaster to deliver an uncommonly serious – yet still suitably gripping – action thriller." On Metacritic, the film has a score 68 out of 100 based on 52 critics, indicating "generally favorable reviews". Audiences polled by CinemaScore gave the film an average grade of "A−" on an A+ to F scale.

Todd McCarthy of The Hollywood Reporter gave the film a positive review, writing, "ruggedness and resilience counts for far more in the characterizations here than does nuance, and everyone delivers as required. From a craft and technical point of view, the film is all but seamless, a credit to the extra care taken to avoid a CGI look." Mike Ryan of Uproxx praised the film's performances and ability to make audiences angry at BP: "I'll be honest, I didn't think we needed a movie about this subject. I've changed my mind. And, if nothing else, I hope it gets people angry again, because the people who did this to our planet, and killed 11 people in the process, got off too easy." Benjamin Lee of The Guardian praised Berg's direction as "admirably, uncharacteristically restrained...[He] stages the action horribly well, capturing the panic and gruesome mayhem without the film ever feeling exploitative. It's spectacularly constructed, yet it doesn't forget about the loss of life, ensuring that, despite thin characterisation, the impact is felt."

Former crew members started their own crowd-funded documentary project before the film's release, out of frustration with factual liberties taken in the film script and in the media.

Accolades

Historical Accuracy 
The film was praised for staying "remarkably close" to the actual events, though it did take some artistic liberties and did a poor job explaining why the blowout occurred.

The movie opens with Mike William's daughter working on a science project and asking for a fossil. Later in the film, Williams is given a fossilised dinosaur tooth. In real life this never happened and was made up to help explain how the explosion occurred.

Throughout the first half of the movie, gas is seen rupturing and coming out of the concrete at the sea floor, this didn't happen.

In the movie, Donald Vidrine (the BP manager of the rig) disregards the first negative pressure test (saying it was the result of the "bladder effect") and then overrules Transocean after the second test. Actually, Vidrine was confused after the first test and contacted several supervisors and on-shore engineers for other opinions. After the second test, the bladder effect was brought up by a Transocean crew member.

In the movie, Williams calls his wife and while in the call he hears the engine's revving and his wife sees the lights getting brighter. In real life, he had just hung up when these things happened.

The lifeboats did actually leave Mike Williams, Andrea Fleytas and 7 others on the rig. However, only Williams jumped off the rig. Fleytas jumped onto the life-raft that was deployed to save the remaining 7 people.

The film also fails to mention that BP was forced to pay $4 billion in environmental felonies.

Not shown in the movie were college students fishing under the rig right when the disaster happened.

References

External links 
 
 
 

2016 films
2016 thriller films
2010s disaster films
American films based on actual events
American disaster films
American thriller films
Deepwater Horizon oil spill
Di Bonaventura Pictures films
2010s English-language films
Disaster films based on actual events
Films about the United States Coast Guard
Films based on newspaper and magazine articles
Films directed by Peter Berg
Films produced by Mark Wahlberg
Films scored by Steve Jablonsky
Films set in 2010
Films set in Louisiana
Films shot in New Orleans
Films with screenplays by Matthew Michael Carnahan
IMAX films
Lionsgate films
Participant (company) films
Summit Entertainment films
Thriller films based on actual events
Films about petroleum
4DX films
2010s American films